This is a list of Quebec television series imports and exports.

Imports

Exports

See also 
EdTV (an American remake of the Quebec film Louis 19, King of the Airwaves (Louis 19, le roi des ondes))
List of Quebec television series
Television of Quebec
Culture of Quebec

References 

 
Lists of television series
Television series imports and exports
International trade-related lists